The New York Cosmos were an American soccer club based in New York. The club was formed in 1970 by brothers Ahmet and Nesuhi Ertegun, with the support of Warner Brothers president Steve Ross, and entered into the North American Soccer League (NASL), which had itself been founded in 1968. Backed by Ross's company, Warner Communications, the Cosmos became the league's strongest club, both on and off the field. The team won five titles while drawing attendances unprecedented in American club soccer. The Cosmos' commercial and on-field success declined during the early 1980s, along with the NASL itself, and after the league folded in 1984 the club dissolved a year later. A new Cosmos team, formed in 2010, is scheduled to begin play in the new second-tier North American Soccer League (contested since 2011) during the 2013 season.

All players who played at least one league match for the Cosmos are given below. A total of 155 outfield players did so, along with 17 goalkeepers, giving a total of 172. Including the United States and Canada, a total of 34 nations from across the Americas, Europe, the Middle East and Africa were represented on the team's rosters over the course of its history. After the United States, the most common nation of origin was England, with 17 Cosmos players; Canada followed with 15. NASL all-star teams included 18 of the club's players in total. Eleven players who appeared as guests in exhibition games are listed separately below.

Key
GK = Goalkeeper
DF = Defender
MF = Midfielder
FW = Forward

Regular season players

By nationality

Guest players

Some well-known players from other teams turned out for the Cosmos in exhibition matches on a game-by-game basis when New York traveled on overseas tours. These guest players are listed below, along with the year they appeared in Cosmos colors.

Footnotes

A.  Bradley held the position of player-coach.
B.  Hunt's 1982 spell was on loan from Coventry City (England).
C.  Ingram played for the Cosmos on loan from Luton Town (England).
D.  Yasin Özdenak played in the United States under the name Erol Yasin, and is generally referred to as such in NASL records.
E.  Although Eskandarian signed permanently for the Cosmos in 1979, he is counted as a guest player for 1978, and so appears on both lists.

References
Bibliography

General
Players sourced to: Jose (2003).
Background sourced to: Jose (2003), Newsham (2006) and Toye (2006).
Notes

 
Association football player non-biographical articles
New York Cosmos
New York Cosmos (1970–1985) players